William James Bailey (6 April 1888 – 21 February 1971) was a British cyclist. He competed in three track sprint events at the 1908 Summer Olympics, but failed to reach the finals.

Bailey competed in cycling for more than 20 years, beyond the age of 40. He then won the national sprint title in 1909, 1912 and 1913, and the world sprint title in 1909–1911 and 1913 (he did not compete in 1912). Bailey turned professional in March 1914, but could not compete due to World War I. In 1920, he won a bronze medal in the sprint at the world championships, and in 1928, aged 40, he set a British sanding start half-mile record at 58 seconds. After retiring from racing he organised competitions and trained cyclists. He prepared the UK team for the 1928 Olympics.

References

External links
 

1888 births
1971 deaths
British male cyclists
Olympic cyclists of Great Britain
Cyclists at the 1908 Summer Olympics
Cyclists from Greater London
20th-century British people